The Municipality of Bovec ( or) is a municipality in northwestern Slovenia. Its center is the town of Bovec. , its mayor is Valter Mlekuž.

Geography
The northern parts of the municipality up the Trenta Valley to the peaks of Mts. Mangart, Jalovec, and Triglav is located within Triglav National Park, but not Bovec itself. Two of the most important mountain passes in the Julian Alps are located in the Municipality of Bovec: the Predil Pass on the border between Slovenia and Italy in the northwest, and the Vršič Pass in the northeast, which connects the Soča Valley to Kranjska Gora in the neighbouring Slovenian region of Upper Carniola. In the southwest the Učja (Uccea) Pass connects Bovec with the Resia Valley in Italy.

Settlements
In addition to the municipal seat of Bovec, the municipality also includes the following settlements:

 Bavšica
 Čezsoča
 Kal–Koritnica
 Lepena
 Log Čezsoški
 Log pod Mangartom
 Plužna
 Soča
 Srpenica
 Strmec na Predelu
 Trenta
 Žaga

Politics
The Municipality of Bovec is governed by a mayor, elected every 4 years by popular vote, and a municipal council of 12 members. In national elections, Bovec has strongly favored conservative candidates, and it is considered one of the most loyal strongholds of the Slovenian Democratic Party in the whole country. In the local elections, however, the vote is usually more dispersed, although mayors of the Slovenian Democratic Party have governed the municipality since 1998.

Tourism
Several natural sights are included in the Municipality of Bovec, such as the source of the Soča River, the  Boka Falls, the Kanin ski resort, and the Trenta Valley, connected to Bovec by a hiking trail. The municipality has a well-developed tourist industry, centered in the town of Bovec itself, with numerous hotels, and an airfield (LJBO).

References

External links

 Municipality of Bovec on Geopedia
  

 
1994 establishments in Slovenia
Bovec